Bis(trimethylsilyl)sulfur diimide is the organosulfur compound with the formula S(NSiMe3)2 (Me = CH3).  A colorless liquid, it is a diaza analogue of sulfur dioxide, i.e., a sulfur diimide.  It is a reagent in the synthesis of sulfur nitrides.  For example, it is a precursor to C2(N2S)2. 

Bis(trimethylsilyl)sulfur diimide is prepared by the reaction of thionyl chloride and sodium bis(trimethylsilyl)amide:
SOCl2  +  2 NaN(SiMe3)2  → S(NSiMe3)2 +  2 NaCl  +  O(SiMe3)2

References

Sulfur(IV) compounds